Purvashrama, is a term used with reference to Sannyasis. The word 'Purvashrama' is a compound of the words pūrva (meaning before, prior to) and āśrama (stage of life), thus referring to the stage of life of a Sannyasi before his Sannyasa.

The word is also used to address family relationships before taking vows of Sanyasis (example - purvashrama father). This is to give emphasis to the nature of poorna-sannyas (complete sannyas) phase, where the pre-monastic life family relationships cease to be considered cosmically binding.

See also
 Ashrama (stage)

Hindu philosophical concepts